Stefanie Heimgartner (born 25 April 1987) is a Swiss businesswoman and politician. She currently serves as a member of the National Council (Switzerland) for the Swiss People's Party since 2019.

Early life and education 
Stefanie Heimgartner was born 25 April 1987 in Baden, Switzerland. She has one sister. In her youth, she engaged as a handball player in various associations. She completed a commercial apprenticeship in Business Administration. She also holds a truck driver's license and is certified to operate them commercially.

Professional career 
She works in the logistics and transportation company of her parents, Heimgartner Transport AG, of which she is a part-owner. Further she is an executive director of Verein Lernwerk in Gebensdorf, which engages in workplace integration for people with disabilities. Further she is a member of the board of trustees of the Stiftung zur Förderung und Unterstützung des Kinderheims Brugg (en. Foundation for the Development and Support of the Orphanage Brugg).

Personal life 
Heimgartner resides in Baden, Switzerland.

In the Swiss Armed Forces, Heimgartner is enlisted as Soldier.

References 

1987 births
Living people
Members of the National Council (Switzerland)
Women members of the National Council (Switzerland)
21st-century Swiss politicians
21st-century Swiss women politicians
21st-century Swiss businesspeople
21st-century Swiss businesswomen
Swiss People's Party politicians
People from Baden, Switzerland